A shakha (Sanskrit , "branch" or "limb") is a Hindu theological school that specializes in learning certain Vedic texts, or else the traditional texts followed by such a school. The term is also used in Hindu philosophy to refer to an adherent of a particular orthodox system.

The schools have different points of view, described as "difference of (Vedic) school". Each school would learn a specific Vedic  (one of the "four Vedas" properly so-called), as well as its associated Brahmana, Aranyakas, Shrautasutras,  Grhyasutras and Upanishads.

In traditional Hindu society affiliation with a specific school is an important aspect of class identity. By the end of the Rig Vedic period the term  had come to be applied to all members of the priestly class, but there were subdivisions within this order based both on varna (class) and on the shakha (branch) with which they were affiliated.  A  who changed school would be called "a traitor to his śākhā".

Summary of schools
These have lists of the numbers of recensions that were believed to have once existed as well as those still extant at the time the works were compiled. Only a small number of recensions have survived.

Saraswati Gangadhar's devotional poetry written in Marathi called Shri Gurucharitra describes different shakhas of 4 Vedas in 27th chapter.

The schools are enumerated below, categorised according to the Veda each expounds.

Rig Veda

The Bashkala recension of the Rigveda has the Khilani which are not present in the Shakala text but is preserved in one Kashmir manuscript (now at Pune). 
The Shakala has the Aitareya-Brahmana, The Bashkala has the Kausitaki-Brahmana.

Shri Gurucharitra mentions 12 shakhas for the Rig Veda namely śrāvakā, śravaṇiyā, jaṭā, śaphaṭa, pāṭhakrama(2), daṇḍa, aśvalāyanī, śāṃkhāyanī, śākalā, bāṣkalā and māṇḍūkā (श्रावका, श्रवणिया, जटा, शफट, पाठक्रम(2), दण्ड, अश्वलायनी, शांखायनी, शाकला, बाष्कला, माण्डूका) in Ovi 35 to 38.

There is, however, Sutra literature from the  shakha, 
both a shrauta sutra and a grhya sutra, both surviving with a commentary (vrtti) by Gargya Naranaya.
Gargya Naranaya's commentary was based on the longer commentary or bhashya by Devasvamin, written in the 11th century.

The  shakha has been recently rediscovered in Banswada in Rajasthan where two septuagenarians are the last surviving practitioners.

Yajur Veda

's  lists forty-two or forty-four out of eighty-six shakhas for the Yajur Veda, but that only five of these are now extant, with a sixth partially extant.
For the Yajur Veda the five (partially in six) shakhas are the (Vajasaneyi Madhandina, Kanva; Taittiriya, Maitrayani, Caraka-Katha, Kapisthala-Katha).

The Yajurvedin shakhas are divided in Shukla (White) and Krishna (Black) schools. The White recensions have separate Brahmanas, while the Black ones have their(much earlier)  Brahmanas interspersed between the Mantras.
 Shukla Yajurveda:  (VSM),  (VSK): Shatapatha Brahmana (ShBM, ShBK)
Krishna Yajurveda:  (TS) with an additional Brahmana, Taittiriya Brahmana (TB),  (MS),  (KS),  (KapS).

Shukla

Krishna

Sama Veda
's  lists twelve shakhas for the Sama Veda out of a thousand that are said to have once existed, but that of these only one or perhaps two are still extant.
The two Samaveda recensions are the Jaiminiya and Kauthuma.

In Ovi 203 to 210 of chapter 27, Shri Gurucharitra mentions 8 of the thousands of shakhas namely āsurāyaṇīyā, vāsurāyaṇīya़ā, vātāntareyā, prāṃjalī, ṛjñagvainavidhā, prācīna yogyaśākhā, jñānayoga and rāṇāyaṇīyā (आसुरायणीया, वासुरायणीय़ा, वातान्तरेया, प्रांजली, ऋज्ञग्वैनविधा, प्राचीन योग्यशाखा, ज्ञानयोग, राणायणीया). Of these rāṇāyaṇīyā (राणायणीया) has 10 shakhas namely rāṇāyaṇīyā, sāṃkhyāyanī, śāṭhyā, mugdala, khalvalā, mahākhalvalā, lāṅ‌galā, kaithumā, gautamā and jaiminī (राणायणीया, सांख्यायनी, शाठ्या, मुग्दल, खल्वला, महाखल्वला, लाङ्‌गला, कैथुमा, गौतमा, जैमिनी).

The Kauthuma shakha has the PB, SadvB, the Jaiminiya shakha has the Jaiminiya Brahmana.

Atharva Veda

Only one shakha of an original nine is now extant for the Atharvaveda. The nine sakhas were Paippalada, Tauda, Mauda, Shaunakiya, Jajala, Jalada, Brahmavada, Devadarsa and Chaarana-Vaidya. In Ovi 217 to 219 of chapter 27, Shri Gurucharitra mentions 9 shakhas namely paippalā, dāntā, pradāṃta, stotā, autā, brahmadā yaśadā, śaunakī, vedadarśā and caraṇavidyā (पैप्पला, दान्ता, प्रदांत, स्तोता, औता, ब्रह्मदा यशदा, शौनकी, वेददर्शा, चरणविद्या).

The Shaunaka is the only shakha of the Atharvaveda for which both printed texts and an active oral tradition are known to still exist.

For the Atharvaveda, both the Shaunakiya and the Paippalada traditions contain textual corruptions, and the original text of the Atharvaveda may only be approximated from comparison between the two.

The Paippalada tradition was discontinued, and its text is known only from manuscripts collected since the 20th century. However some Orissa Brahmins still continue the tradition of Paippalada.
No Brahmana is known for the Shaunaka shakha.
The Paippalada is possibly associated with the Gopatha Brahmana.

Notes

References
List of Pundits from different shakhas in India 
State wise list of shakhas 
 Michael Witzel, Tracing the Vedic dialects in Dialectes dans les litteratures Indo-Aryennes ed. Caillat, Paris, 1989, 97–265.

Vedas
Hindu studies